Minervarya dhaka is a species of frogs found in Dhaka, Bangladesh. Specimens have been collected from the campus of Sher-e-Bangla Agricultural University in Dhaka and also from Mymensingh Division.

Other geographically proximal species are Minervarya nepalensis, Minervarya pierrei, Minervarya syhadrensis, Minervarya teraiensis, and Minervarya asmati.

Discovery
It was discovered in 2016 in Dhaka, the capital of Bangladesh and a megacity. The particular frog was established to be a separate species using two mitochondrial DNA genes (12S rRNA and 16S rRNA), by research supported by the "Ecological Genetics Research Unit" in the Department of Biosciences of the University of Helsinki, Finland.

References

dhaka
Amphibians of Bangladesh
Endemic fauna of Bangladesh
Amphibians described in 2016